Margaret Leonie Edmond (née Suchestow; born 11 June 1946) is an Australian architect.

Education and formative years
As a child, Edmond's family lived in houses designed by notable Australian architects—the Bridgeford House in Black Rock, designed by Robin Boyd in 1953; and the Quamby apartments in South Yarra, designed by Roy Grounds. She has reflected on this upbringing, noting that "from a very early age I was aware that houses I had lived in differed from those of my friends".

Edmond studied architecture at University of Melbourne alongside her first husband, landscape architect Robin Edmond. She completed her Bachelor of Architecture in 1969.

Career
In 1974, she formed a partnership with her husband Peter Corrigan to create the Melbourne-based architectural firm Edmond and Corrigan. She remains a principal of the firm, and manages and presents much of the work.

She was described by Neil Clerehan as "probably the nation's foremost female architect".

The first published projects of Edmond and Corrigan—the Edinburgh Gardens Pavilion (design completed 1977) and Patford House (design completed 1975) in Fitzroy—were developed by Edmond alone.

Edmond became a member of the Deakin University Council in 1999, acting as Deputy Chancellor from 2004-07. She sits as chairperson of Deakin University's Campus Planning Committee.

In 2014, Edmond sat on the jury of the Houses Awards—an annual program to award Australia's best residential architecture projects.

Awards and honours
On 21 March 2015, Edmond was awarded an honorary Doctor of Architecture by the University of Melbourne.

In 2001, she was awarded a Life Fellowship by the RAIA.

Personal life
Edmond is the daughter of Melbourne fashion designer Linda Suchestow.

Further reading

References

Living people
Australian women architects
Architects from Melbourne
Place of birth missing (living people)
1946 births
20th-century Australian architects
21st-century Australian architects
20th-century Australian women
21st-century Australian women
Academic staff of Deakin University
University of Melbourne alumni